Calanthe fargesii is a species of plant in the family Orchidaceae. It is endemic to China (Chongqing, Gansu, Guizhou, and Sichuan provinces).  Its natural habitats are subtropical or tropical moist lowland forests and subtropical or tropical moist montane forests.

The Latin specific epithet fargesii refers to  the French missionary and amateur botanist Père Paul Guillaume Farges (1844–1912).

References 

Endemic orchids of China
Vulnerable plants
fargesii
Taxonomy articles created by Polbot